Pidoux is a surname. Notable people with the surname include:

 Victor Pidoux (1807–1879), French politician
 Pierre Pidoux (1905–2001), Swiss theologian, organist and musicologist
 Edmond Pidoux (1908–2004), Swiss writer
 Xavier Pidoux de La Maduère (1910–1977), French politician
 Philippe Pidoux (b. 1943), Swiss politician
 Roland Pidoux (b. 1946), French cellist and conductor
 Raphaël Pidoux (b. 1967), French cellist